Malachy Ó Caollaidhe, also known as Malachy Queally, Malachias Quælly, O'Queely or O'Quechly (died 1645) was an Irish Roman Catholic archbishop of Tuam; he was called by Irish writers Maelseachlainn Ua Cadhla, by John Colgan Queleus, and erroneously by Thomas Carte, O'Kelly.

Life
Born in County Clare, he was son of Donatus Quælly. He belonged to a family which ruled Connemara till 1238, when they were conquered by the O'Flaherties.

He became a student at the College of Navarre in Paris, and there graduated with a Doctorate of Divinity. He returned to Ireland and was appointed the vicar-apostolic of Killaloe by a papal brief on 30 August 1619. Following the death of Florence Conroy, he was appointed the archbishop of Tuam on 28 June 1630 and consecrated  at Galway on 10 October 1630 by Thomas Walsh, archbishop of Cashel, with Richard Arthur, bishop of Limerick, and Boetius Egan, bishop of Elphin, serving as co-consecrators.

In 1632 he presided at a council held at Galway to enforce the decrees of the council of Trent in Ireland. He caused the ancient wooden figure of St. Mac Dara in the church of Cruachmic Dara, County Galway, to be buried on the island, probably in consequence of some superstitious proceedings to which it had given rise.

His work in Tuam provoked a complaint from Richard Boyle, the Church of Ireland archbishop of Tuam, in 1641. Queally attended the national synod of 1643, by which the Catholic Confederation was organized, and its assembly at Kilkenny in 1645. He was elected to the Supreme Council, and later was appointed President of Connaught. The Papal Nuncio Giovanni Battista Rinuccini planned to meet him and Heber MacMahon upon his arrival in 1645 but he died before this could occur: Pope Innocent X had recommended him by letter to Rinuccini as a man to be trusted.

During the Irish Confederate Wars, he raised a body of fighting men in Galway and Mayo, and joined the forces of Sir James Dillon, near Ballysadare, County Sligo. They aimed to recover Sligo from the Scottish Covenanters. On Sunday, 26 October 1645, Viscount Taafe and Dillon dined with Queally, and while they were dining the Irish forces were attacked by Sir Charles Coote, Sir William Cole, and Sir Francis Hamilton, and put to flight. The archbishop's secretary, Tadhg O'Connell, was killed trying to save his master, and the archbishop himself was first wounded by a pistol-shot, and then cut down. The Earl of Glamorgan's agreement with the Confederate Catholics and a letter from Charles I of England were found in his pocket. The English Parliament published the correspondence to prejudice both parties, Catholic and royalist.

Walter Lynch on the Irish side gave £30 for his body, which was carried to Tuam. It was reburied some time later by Brigit, Lady Athenry, but the tomb is no longer known. Dr. Edmund Meara wrote an epitaph for him in Latin verse, but failed to discover his burial-place.

Works
He wrote an account of the Aran Islands, printed in Colgan's Acta Sanctorum Hiberniæ (p. 714), and is translated in James Hardiman's edition of Roderic O'Flaherty's Description of West Connaught.

References
C. P. Meehan, Irish Hierarchy in the 17th Century (16th edit., Dublin, about 1888)
Denis Murphy, Our Martyrs (Dublin: Fallon, 1896)

Notes

External links
 

Attribution

1645 deaths
Irish writers
University of Paris alumni
People of the Irish Confederate Wars
People from County Clare
Roman Catholic archbishops of Tuam
17th-century Irish Roman Catholic priests
People from County Galway
Burials in the Republic of Ireland
Year of birth unknown
Roman Catholic bishops of Killaloe